Windisch may refer to:

 Windisch (surname) (including a list of people with the name)
 Windisch, Switzerland, a municipality in the canton of Aargau
 Windisch (ethnonym), German word Wends for Slavs
 Windisch Kamnitz, German name of Srbská Kamenice, a village in the Czech Republic, Ústí nad Labem Region
 Windisch-Feistritz, German name of Slovenska Bistrica, a town south of Maribor in eastern Slovenia
 Windisch technique, a ski jumping technique